Tamboekiesdraai is a town in Zululand District Municipality in the KwaZulu-Natal province of South Africa.

References

Populated places in the eDumbe Local Municipality